Federale is an American psychedelic rock band based in Portland, Oregon, United States that was influenced by the music of European genre films such as Spaghetti Westerns and giallos, particularly the music of Ennio Morricone.

History
Federale formed in 2004, after the breakup of Portland band, Cocaine Unicorn, by Collin Hegna of The Brian Jonestown Massacre. Their music is often compared to the work of Ennio Morricone. Other notable members include Sebastian Bibb-Barrett of The Builders and the Butchers, Colin Sheridan of The High Violets, and Dusty Dybvig of Bark Hide and Horn.

Discography
 La Rayar: A Tale of Revenge (Revolver Records, 2008)
 Devil In A Boot (Revolver Records, 2009)
 The Blood Flowed Like Wine (Federale Records, 2012)
 All The Colours Of The Dark (Death Waltz Originals, 2016)
 No Justice (Jealous Butcher Records, 2019)

References

External links
 Official website
  Federale on Myspace
 Federale on CDBaby

Musical groups from Portland, Oregon
Spaghetti Western composers
2004 establishments in Oregon
Musical groups established in 2004